The Original Disco Man is the 48th studio album by American musician James Brown. The album was released in July 1979, by Polydor Records. Brandye were credited for backing vocals and the front cover photograph was taken by Joel Bernstein.

Track listing
All tracks composed by Brad Shapiro and Randy McCormick; except where indicated

References

1979 albums
James Brown albums
Albums produced by Brad Shapiro
Polydor Records albums